Kelly Brown (born 1982) is a Scottish male rugby footballer.

Kelly Brown may also refer to:

Kelly Brown (actress), American actress
Kelly Brown (cricketer) (born 1973), New Zealand cricketer
Kelly Williams Brown (born 1984), American writer and author
Kelly Brown (gymnast) (born 1965), Canadian gymnast
Kelly Brown (drag racer), American Top Fuel drag racer
Kelly Brown, Miss Montana USA, 1994

See also
Keely Brown (curler) - (born 1993), Canadian curler
Keely Brown (goaltender) - (born 1976), Canadian goaltender